Top Springs is a town and locality in the Northern Territory of Australia located about  south of the territory capital of Darwin at the junction of the Buchanan and Buntine highways.

The locality's boundaries and name were gazetted on 4 April 2007. The locality is named after the town with the name being ultimately derived from springs located on the route of the Murranji Track. Development within the town/locality consists of a roadhouse.

The 2016 Australian census which was conducted in August 2016 reports that Top Springs had a population of 3 people.

Top Springs is located within the federal division of Lingiari, the territory electoral division of Stuart and the local government area of the Victoria Daly Region.

References

Towns in the Northern Territory
Victoria Daly Region